Edwin Daniel McGuinness (17 May 1856 – 21 April 1901) was Providence's first Irish Catholic mayor.

Personal life
Edwin Daniel McGuinness was born in Providence, Rhode Island on May 17, 1856, son of Bernard McGuinness and Mary Higgins, both Irish immigrants. He attended public schools, and received a Bachelor of Arts degree from Brown University in 1877. He went on to receive his law degree in 1879 from Boston University Law School. He was admitted to the Rhode Island Bar in that same year and joined with John Doran (later a justice with the Rhode Island superior court) to form the firm of McGuinness & Doran.

McGuinness married Ellen T. Noonan of Providence on November 22, 1881. She was the daughter of Timothy and Ellen Noonan. They had one daughter.

Political life
McGuinness was elected city alderman of Providence (1889 – 1893). He ran for mayor in 1893 and was defeated by Frank F. Olney; he ran again in 1895 and won. In the 1896 campaign, McGuinness carried every single election district in the city. Although he ran on the Democratic ticket, he was known for running a non-partisan administration.

A major issue during McGuinness's terms as mayor was a conflict with the New York, New Haven & Hartford Railroad Company. They had contracted to build rainsheds on their new station in Providence, but failed to fulfill this obligation. McGuinness refused to let the station open until the rainsheds were built. It was said to be a bitter fight between the mayor and the railroad.

Regrettably the political responsibility took a toll on his health and he suffered a nervous breakdown during his second term as Mayor.  McGuinness took ill in 1898, and even a trip south could not restore his health.

He died at his home in Providence on April 21, 1901 at the age of 45. He was buried in St. Francis Cemetery, Pawtucket.

In 2007 he was inducted into the Rhode Island Heritage Hall of Fame.

References

External links
 

American people of Irish descent
Mayors of Providence, Rhode Island
1856 births
1901 deaths
Burials in Rhode Island
Brown University alumni
Rhode Island Democrats
Rhode Island lawyers
Boston University School of Law alumni
American Roman Catholics